Lobophytum venustum is a species of the genus Lobophytum.

References 

Alcyoniidae